The Washington Diplomats were an American soccer club based in Washington, D.C. The club was formed in 1974 when the North American Soccer League (NASL), itself founded in 1968, granted a franchise to a Washington, D.C. based business group. The team played all their home games at RFK Stadium in 1974, but in 1975 and 1976 they played most of their games at W.T. Woodson High School in Northern Virginia, including all of their 1976 games. They played indoor home matches at the neighboring D.C. Armory. After a lackluster beginning to the franchise, the Diplomats qualified for the playoffs and increased average game attendance in each of their last three years of existence. Additionally, in their final year, the Diplomats were able to sign the future European Player of the Century Johan Cruyff. After the 1980 season the Diplomats folded when then owner, the Madison Square Garden Corp., had accumulated losses of $6 million and team president Steve Danzansky could not gather enough money to keep the team alive.

After the original Diplomats folded following the 1980 season, the Detroit Express moved to Washington to become the new Diplomats. This team only lasted for one season.

Below is a non-exhaustive list of players who played at least one league match for the Diplomats.

Key
GK = Goalkeeper
DF = Defender
MF = Midfielder
FW = Forward

Regular season players

By nationality

References

 
Association football player non-biographical articles
Washington Diplomats
Washington Diplomats players